Nectalí Vizcaíno (born July 8, 1977) is a former Colombian footballer.

References

External links
 http://www.bdfa.com.ar/jugadores-NEFTALI-VIZCAINO-44888.html

1977 births
Living people
People from Bolívar Department
Colombian footballers
Categoría Primera B players
Independiente Santa Fe footballers
La Equidad footballers
Bogotá FC footballers
Atlético Huila footballers
L.D.U. Loja footballers
C.D. ESPOLI footballers
Cortuluá footballers
Colombian expatriate footballers
Expatriate footballers in Ecuador

Association footballers not categorized by position